The Northern Ireland Constitution Act 1973 is an Act of the Parliament of the United Kingdom which received the royal assent on 18 July 1973. The Act abolished the suspended Parliament of Northern Ireland and the post of Governor and made provision for a devolved administration consisting of an Executive chosen by the new Northern Ireland Assembly devised under the Sunningdale Agreement; the Assembly had already been created by the Northern Ireland Assembly Act 1973, passed two months earlier.

"Status of Northern Ireland as part of United Kingdom"
When the Republic of Ireland ceased to be a member of the British Commonwealth, Westminster had responded with the Ireland Act 1949.  Amongst its other provisions, the Act had guaranteed that Northern Ireland would not cease to remain a part of the United Kingdom "without the consent of the Parliament of Northern Ireland" (s. 1(2)); this declaration had proven to be controversial both with the Irish government and with Northern Ireland's nationalist community.

Since the 1973 Act abolished the Parliament of Northern Ireland, it replaced the 1949 guarantee with one based on a popular vote rather than a parliamentary vote (s. 1):
It is hereby declared that Northern Ireland remains part of Her Majesty's dominions and of the United Kingdom, and it is hereby affirmed that in no event will Northern Ireland or any part of it cease to be part of Her Majesty's dominions and of the United Kingdom without the consent of the majority of the people of Northern Ireland voting in a poll held for the purposes of this section in accordance with Schedule 1 to this Act.

A referendum on similar lines had already been held on 8 March 1973, with 98.9% of voters backing the union after a nationalist boycott of the poll. Schedule 1 of the Constitution Act provided that no further referendum was to be held before 9 March 1983. If the result of that or any future referendum meant that Northern Ireland remained part of the United Kingdom, a subsequent referendum on the issue could not be held for a further ten years.

The Northern Ireland Act 1998 replaced the 1973 referendum requirement, requiring a referendum if it "appears likely" to pass and unity negotiations if it does pass, and reducing the gap between referendums to seven years.

Attempts to prevent discrimination
Part III of the Act dealt with discrimination "on the ground of religious belief or political opinion." Any existing Act of the Parliament of Northern Ireland, any Measure to be passed by the new Assembly, and any secondary legislation was declared to be void if it discriminated against an individual or "class of persons" on the basis of their religious or political beliefs. It was also said to be unlawful for the Executive or a government body to "discriminate, or aid, induce or incite another to discriminate" against someone on the same grounds. Discrimination was defined as "treat[ing a] person or [a] class [of persons] less favourably in any circumstances than other persons are treated in those circumstances by the law for the time being in force in Northern Ireland."

The Standing Advisory Commission on Human Rights (SACHR) was also created.

Abolition of the Parliament, etc
The Parliament of Northern Ireland, which had been indefinitely suspended on 30 March 1972 by the Northern Ireland (Temporary Provisions) Act 1972, was now permanently abolished. Its staff were transferred to work for the new Assembly.

The office of Governor of Northern Ireland was also abolished. Unlike the position with the Parliament, his duties were not transferred to a new role but were mainly absorbed by the Secretary of State for Northern Ireland. Responsibility for appointing (or removing) the Director of Public Prosecutions for Northern Ireland was given to the Attorney General for Northern Ireland (which office was now attached to that of the Attorney General for England and Wales).

Devolution
Devolution was only to come into effect if an Executive (government) could be formed that had the support of the Assembly and that was "likely to be widely accepted throughout the community". The Act listed excepted matters and reserved matters; the former were areas in which the Assembly was not permitted to legislate; the latter were areas which the Secretary of State for Northern Ireland could transfer into the Assembly's power when and if he saw fit.

Excepted matters
the monarchy
the Westminster parliament
international relations (other than dealings with the Republic of Ireland in a limited set of fields)
certain topics covered by the European Communities Act
the armed forces
dignities and titles of honour
treason and treason felony
nationality and immigration
pre-existing taxes
the appointment or removal of judges
elections
coinage and banknotes
the National Savings Bank
extraordinary powers for dealing with terrorism or "subversion"

The Executive
The Northern Ireland Executive was to be headed by a chief executive and was to include a maximum of eleven other members (including the heads of the various government departments). The chief executive was also to be ex officio "Leader of the Assembly".

New members of the Executive were also required to take an oath (or make an affirmation):
I swear by Almighty God [or I affirm] that I will uphold the laws of Northern Ireland and conscientiously fulfil as a member of the Northern Ireland Executive my duties under the Northern Ireland Constitution Act 1973 in the interests of Northern Ireland and its people.

Sources
Northern Ireland Constitution Act 1973 [c.36]

References

External links

Extracts from the text as enacted

United Kingdom Acts of Parliament 1973
Constitutional laws of Northern Ireland
History of Northern Ireland
Politics of Northern Ireland
Unionism in the United Kingdom
1973 in Northern Ireland
Acts of the Parliament of the United Kingdom concerning Northern Ireland
Northern Ireland devolution
Northern Ireland Assembly (1973)
July 1973 events in the United Kingdom